Terragnolo (Cimbrian: Leimtal) is a comune (municipality) in Trentino in the northern Italian region Trentino-Alto Adige/Südtirol, located about  south of Trento.

Terragnolo borders the following municipalities: Folgaria, Rovereto, Trambileno, Laghi and Posina.

References

External links
 Official website

Cities and towns in Trentino-Alto Adige/Südtirol